These 218 genera belong to Conoderinae, a subfamily of true weevils in the family Curculionidae. There are at least 2,400 described species in Conoderinae.

Conoderinae genera

 Abrimoides Kojima & Lyal, 2002
 Acatus Marshall, 1930
 Achirozetes Heller, 1924
 Acopturus Heller, 1895
 Acoptus LeConte, 1876
 Agametina Heller, 1915
 Agametis Pascoe, 1870
 Agathorhinus Fairmaire, 1893
 Almetus Marshall, 1939
 Amorbaius Schoenherr, 1845
 Amphibleptus Marshall, 1939
 Anamelus Marshall, 1940
 Anascopus Marshall, 1935
 Anchicoryssomerus Voss, 1965
 Anchistosphilia Heller, 1894
 Annahowdenia Alonso-Zarazaga & Lyal
 Anobleptus Marshall, 1939
 Anthobaphus Faust, 1899
 Aphyocnemus Faust, 1898
 Aphyomerus Hartmann, 1904
 Apiophorus Roelofs, 1875
 Apsophus Hartmann, 1904
 Arachnobas Boisduval, 1835
  Arachnomorpha Champion, 1906
 Archocopturus Heller, 1895
 Atelephae Voss, 1940
 Balaninurus Heller, 1895
 Balanogastris Faust, 1898
 Barystrabus Hustache, 1932
 Borthus Marshall, 1939
 Brephiope Pascoe, 1874
 Brimoda Pascoe, 1871
 Brimoides Kojima & Lyal, 2002
 Caenochira Pascoe, 1885
 Caldaranthus Alonso-Zarazaga & Lyal
 Calophylaitis Heller, 1924
 Campyloscelus Schoenherr, 1845
 Chelothippia Marshall, 1938
 Chirozetes Pascoe, 1870
 Cledus Marshall, 1958
 Cnemoxys Marshall, 1956
 Colpothorax Desbrochers, 1890
 Conoderes Schoenherr, 1833
 Conradtiella Hustache, 1931
 Copturomimus Heller, 1895
 Copturomorpha Champion, 1906
 Copturosomus Heller, 1895
 Copturus Schönherr, 1825
 Cordierella Hustache, 1932
 Corynemerus Fahraeus, 1871
 Coryssomerus Schoenherr, 1825
 Coryssopus Schoenherr, 1826
 Costolatychus Heller, 1906
 Coturpus R.S. Anderson, 1994
 Crassocopturus Rheinheimer, 2011
 Cratosomus Schoenherr, 1825
 Curanigus Faust, 1898
 Cylindrocopturinus Sleeper, 1963
 Cylindrocopturus Heller, 1895
 Cyllophorus Faust, 1886
 Daedania Pascoe, 1871
 Damurus Heller, 1895
 Decorseia Hustache, 1922
 Dichelotrox Heller, 1904
 Egiona Pascoe, 1874
 Elassophilus Faust, 1899
 Elattocerus Schoenherr, 1847
 Emexaure Pascoe, 1871
 Epiphylax Schoenherr, 1845
 Eucorynemerus Hustache, 1927
 Eulechriops Faust, 1896
 Euryommatus Roger, 1857
 Euzurus Champion, 1906
 Faustiella Berg, 1898
 Gandarius Fairmaire, 1902
 Ganyopis Pascoe, 1871
 Gronosphilia Hustache, 1931
 Guiomatus Faust, 1899
 Gurreanthus Alonso-Zarazaga & Lyal
 Haplocolus Marshall, 1956
 Hedycera Pascoe, 1870
 Helleriella Champion, 1906
 Hemicolpus Heller, 1895
 Histeropus Hustache, 1922
 Homoeometamelus Hustache, 1936
 Hoplitopales Schoenherr, 1843
 Hoplocopturus Heller, 1895
 Hypophylax Fairmaire, 1904
 Hypoplagius Desbrochers, 1891
 Hyposphilius Marshall, 1957
 Idopelma Faust, 1898
 Isocopturus Hustache, 1931
 Isomicrus Hartmann, 1904
 Kivuanella Hustache, 1934
 Kumozo Morimoto, 1960
 Lamitema Lea, 1910
 Lamyrus Schoenherr, 1847
 Larides Champion, 1906
 Latychellus Hustache, 1938
 Latychus Pascoe, 1872
 Lavabrenymus Hoffinann, 1966
 Lechriops Schönherr, 1825
 Lisporhinus Faust, 1886
 Lissoderes Champion, 1906
 Lissoglena Pascoe, 1874
 Lobops Schoenherr, 1845
 Lobotrachelus Schoenherr, 1838
 Machaerocnemis Heller, 1895
 Macramorbaeus Voss, 1971
 Macrocopturus Heller, 1895
 Macrolechriops Champion, 1906
 Macrotelephae Morimoto, 1960
 Macrotimorus Heller, 1895
 Marshallanthus Alonso-Zarazaga & Lyal
 Mecopoidellus Hustache, 1931
 Mecopomorphus Hustache, 1920
 Mecopus Schoenherr, 1825
 Menemachus Schoenherr, 1843
 Meneudetellus Hustache, 1937
 Meneudetus Faust, 1898
 Metamelus Faust, 1898
 Metastrabus Hustache, 1922
 Metetra Pascoe, 1874
 Metialma Pascoe, 1871
 Microzurus Heller, 1895
 Microzygops Champion, 1906
 Mnemyne Pascoe, 1880
 Mnemynurus Heller, 1895
 Neocampyloscelus Hustache, 1941
 Neocoryssopus Hustache, 1932
 Neomecopus Hustache, 1921
 Nipponosphadasmus Morimoto, 1959
 Odoacis Pascoe, 1865
 Odoanus Heller, 1929
 Odontomaches Schoenherr, 1843
 Odozetes Heller, 1922
 Oebrius Pascoe, 1874
 Olsufieffella Hustache, 1939
 Osphilia Pascoe, 1871
 Osphiliades Heller, 1894
 Othippia Pascoe, 1874
 Panigena Pascoe, 1874
 Panoptes Gerstaecker, 1860
 Paracorynemerus Hustache, 1928
 Paramnemyne Heller, 1895
 Paramnemynellus Hustache, 1932
 Parazygops Desbrochers, 1890
 Parepiphylax Hustache, 1934
 Parisocordylus Faust, 1895
 Pastolus Hustache, 1933
 Peleropsella Hustaehe, 1931
 Peloropus Schoenherr, 1836
 Peltophorus Schoenherr, 1845
 Pempheres Pascoe, 1871
 Pempheromima Heller, 1898
 Pempherulus Marshall, 1941
 Phacemastix Schoenherr, 1847
 Phaenomerus Schoenherr, 1836
 Phaulotrodes Faust, 1898
 Phileas Champion, 1906
 Philenis Champion, 1906
 Philides Champion, 1906
 Philinna Champion, 1906
 Phylaitis Pascoe, 1871
 Phylanticus Faust, 1898
 Piazolechriops Heller, 1906
 Piazurus Schoenherr, 1825
 Pinarus Schoenherr, 1826
 Platycleidus Faust, 1898
 Podeschrus Roelofs, 1875
 Poecilma Germar, 1821
 Poecilogaster Heller, 1895
 Procuranigus Hustache, 1928
 Psalistus Gerstaecker, 1871
 Pseniclea Pascoe, 1874
 Pseudopiazurus Heller, 1906
 Pseudopinarus Heller, 1906
 Psomus Casey, 1892
 Pycnorhinus Marshall, 1958
 Pycnosphilius Marshall, 1939
 Rhadinocerus Schoenherr, 1847
 Rhinolechriops Hustache, 1939
 Rhombicodes Marshall, 1947
 Rhynchorthus Marshall, 1953
 Rimboda Heller, 1925
 Saphicus Pascoe, 1886
 Scaphus Marshall, 1952
 Sceloprion Marshall, 1957
 Schoenherria Blanchard, 1853
 Scoliomerus Marshall, 1956
 Scolytoproctus Faust, 1895
 Scolytotarsus Schedl, 1937
 Scotoephilus Hartmann, 1904
 Sphadasmus Schoenherr, 1844
 Stasiastes Faust, 1895
 Sympiezopellus Hustache, 1931
 Sympiezopus Schoenherr, 1838
 Synergatus Berg, 1898
 Synophthalmus Lacordaire, 1863
 Tachylechriops Heller, 1895
 Talanthia Pascoe, 1871
 Talimanus Marshall, 1943
 Telephae Pascoe, 1870
 Temialma Lea, 1910
 Tetragonops Gerstaecker, 1855
 Tetragonopsella Hustache, 1931
 Timorus Schoenherr, 1838
 Tomicoproctus Faust, 1898
 Trichodocerus Chevrolat, 1879
 Turcopus R.S. Anderson, 1994
 Tydeotyrius Voss, 1958
 Tyriotes Pascoe, 1882
 Tyriotydeus Hustache, 1928
 Xeniella Hustache, 1931
 Zygops Schoenherr, 1825
 Zygopsella Champion, 1906
 † Doryaspis Chevrolat, 1844
 † Geratozygops Davis and Engel, 2006

References